Henry I of Nassau,  († Rome, August 1167), was the first person who named himself count of Nassau.

Biography

Henry was probably a son of count Rupert II of Laurenburg and an unknown woman.

Henry is mentioned as count of Nassau between 1160 and 1167. He ruled together with his cousin Rupert III.

In 1161, Henry was in the army camp of Emperor Frederick I Barbarossa. In 1167, Henry was the commander of an army of the Electorate of Cologne in Italy. Henry died of the plague in Rome in August 1167.

No marriage has been mentioned of Henry, he probably never married.

Sources
 This article was translated from the corresponding Dutch Wikipedia article, as of 2018-08-25.

References

External links
 Family tree of the early House of Nassau.
 Nassau in: Medieval Lands. A prosopography of medieval European noble and royal families.

Counts of Nassau
12th-century people of the Holy Roman Empire
1167 deaths
Year of birth unknown